Bommai is a 1964 Indian Tamil-language thriller film, directed by S. Balachander. Featuring a walking-talking doll as the main character, the film had an ensemble cast of newcomers, while S. Balachander, L. Vijayalakshmi and V. S. Raghavan appeared in prominent roles. The film was an adaptation of Alfred Hitchcock's 1936 British film Sabotage. It was released on 25 September 1964.

Plot 

In an attempt to kill the hero (Balachander), the villain (V. S. Raghavan), along with his gang place a bomb in a walking doll. Unexpectedly, the doll comes back to the car in which the gang travels, killing all of them.

Cast 

 S. Balachander as Somasundaram
 L. Vijayalakshmi as Mallika
 Ramesh as Anand
 Lakshmirajam
 V. S. Raghavan as Jagadish
 Srinivasan as Prabhakar
 Maali as Mani
 Sadan as Sampath
 V. Gopalakrishnan as Manikkam
 S. N. Lakshmi as Manikkam's mother
 P. D. Sambandam
 Anandan
 Murthi
 Shoba

Production 
Balachander, who was known for his critically acclaimed suspense thriller films Andha Naal (1954) and Avana Ivan!? (1962) made Bommai on the same genre. The film was inspired by Alfred Hitchcock's 1936 British film Sabotage. Balachander made a few changes in the script to suit the tastes of Tamil audience. A walking-talking doll, which carries the bomb, played the main character in Bommai. To cast the doll, Balachander was in search for a long time and even tried one from the United States. Incidentally, while shopping in Parry's Corner, he found the right doll in a roadside shop and bought it. While Balachander wrote the story and screenplay, his friend Ve. Lakshmanan wrote the dialogues. Rochelle Shah appeared as an actress, this being the only film she ever acted in. Bommai is the first Tamil film in which the director introduces the cast and crew verbally, rather than using film credits.

Music 
The soundtrack consisted of six songs, all written by Balachander's associate Ve. Lakshmanan. The music for songs, was composed by Balachander himself, while the background score was composed by D. B. Ramachandran. The philosophical song "Neeyum Bommai Naanum Bommai" marked the playback singing debut of K. J. Yesudas in Tamil cinema. In 2014, when the song was re-used in Moodar Koodam, Yesudas recorded the same for Moodar Koodam, coincidentally marking his completion of 50 years in the Tamil film music industry. The following song list was adapted from a book authored by K. Neelamegam.

Release and reception 
Although completed and censored in 1963, the film was released only on 25 September the following year. The Indian Express wrote though "the film fails to grip"; however "A neat, tidy, suspense packet". The reviewer praised the film's cinematography but criticised the background score and editing. On 11 October 1964, Ananda Vikatan wrote, "You will not realise how time flies by watching this film". The film completed 100 days in many theatres in Madras. Its commercial success helped Balachander recover from the loss incurred on his previous film Avana Ivan.

References

Sources

External links 
 

1960s Tamil-language films
1960s thriller films
1964 films
Films about dolls
Films directed by S. Balachander
Indian black-and-white films
Films scored by S. Balachander
Indian remakes of British films
Indian thriller films